Moerbeke (unofficially known as Moerbeke-Waas) is a municipality in the north of East Flanders, Belgium.

Moerbeke can also refer to:

Places
 , a village in Geraardsbergen, Belgium
 Moerbeke, (original) Dutch name for Morbecque, a municipality in the French Westhoek, France

Surname
 Pierre van Moerbeke (born 1944), Belgian mathematician
 Willem van Moerbeke, a Flemish medieval translator

Other uses
 K.F.C. Moerbeke, football club based in Moerbeke

See also
 Moerbeek, a village in the  municipality of Hollands Kroon, Netherlands